Meldrum is a band.

Meldrum may also refer to:

Meldrum (surname)
Meldrum transmitting station, Scottish radio transmitter
Meldrum Academy
Meldrum, Bell County, Kentucky
Meldrum Bay, Ontario

See also
Oldmeldrum